The 1988 Buffalo Bills season was the franchise's 29th overall season as a football team and the 19th in the National Football League. The Bills ended a streak of four consecutive losing seasons by winning the AFC East; they finished the NFL's 1988 season with a record of twelve wins and four losses; it was the club's first winning season since 1981, its first 12-win season since the 1964 AFL championship season, and only the fifth double-digit win season in team history. The Bills were 8–0 at home for the first time in their franchise history. On the road, the Bills were 4–4. From an attendance standpoint, the franchise set a record for attendance with 631,818 fans.

This was the first of four consecutive AFC East titles for the Bills. They started the season 11–1 before losing three of their final four games, costing them the top seed in the AFC, and home-field advantage throughout the playoffs.

It was Buffalo's first trip to the postseason since 1981. The Bills were the #2 seed in the AFC (behind #1 Cincinnati), giving the Bills their first home playoff game since the 1966 AFL Championship, and their first ever playoff game at Rich Stadium. The 1988 season would be the first of five AFC Championship game appearances over six seasons, and their only loss in the conference championship game.

The 1988 season was the first for running back Thurman Thomas, nose tackle Jeff Wright, and linebacker Carlton Bailey. Thomas would rush for 881 yards, despite only carrying the ball 207 times (42.7% of total team carries by a running back) while sharing carries with Robb Riddick, Jamie Mueller and Ronnie Harmon.

The Bills had a dominant defense in 1988: they gave up the fewest points (237) and the fewest total yards (4,578) in the AFC in 1988. The defensive unit was given the nickname "Blizzard Defense," alluding to Buffalo's harsh winters.

Four Bills players made the All-Pro team in 1988: defensive end Bruce Smith, linebackers Shane Conlan and Cornelius Bennett, and kicker Scott Norwood.

Head coach Marv Levy was named NFL Coach of the Year by The Sporting News and UPI.

Offseason

NFL draft 

ESPN's cameras watched Oklahoma State running back Thurman Thomas in his home as he waited to be drafted. He fell to the second round, where the Bills made him their first pick at 40th overall. Thomas would go on to a Pro Football Hall of Fame career, where he would eclipse O. J. Simpson's all-time team rushing record with 12,074 yards. Thomas would set an NFL record by leading the league in yards-from-scrimmage for four consecutive years, from 1989–1992. (The record of three was previously held by Hall of Famer Jim Brown.) Thomas was a five-time Pro Bowl selection and NFL Offensive Player of the Year in 1992.

Personnel

Staff

Roster

Regular season

Schedule

Season summary

Week 1 

 Source: Pro-Football-Reference.com

Week 2

Week 3

Week 4

Week 5 

 Source: Pro-Football-Reference.com

Week 6 

 Source: Pro-Football-Reference.com

Week 7

Week 8

Week 9 

    
    
    
    

 Thurman Thomas 23 Rush, 116 Yds

Week 12 

    
    
    
    
    

The Bills clinch the AFC Eastern division title.

Week 16

Standings

Playoffs

AFC Divisional Playoff 

Buffalo's first playoff game since 1981 was a 17–10 win over the Oilers. Jim Kelly threw for 244 yards and an interception while Thurman Thomas and Robb Riddick had rushing scores to go with 87 rushing yards. The Bills intercepted Warren Moon once and forced two Oilers fumbles.

AFC Championship Game 

The Bengals forced three interceptions and allowed only 45 rushing yards and 136 passing yards to go with an offense that held the ball for 39:29 out of sixty minutes. Bills starting running back Thurman Thomas was held to just six yards on four carries, while quarterback Jim Kelly completed only 14-of-30 passes for 161 yards, one touchdown, and three interceptions.

Awards and records

All-Pros 

First Team
 Bruce Smith, Defensive end
 Shane Conlan, Linebacker
 Cornelius Bennett, Linebacker
 Scott Norwood, Kicker

Second Team
 Kent Hull, Center
 Nate Odomes, Cornerback (Associated Press honorable mention)

References

External links 
 1988 Buffalo Bills at Pro-Football-Reference.com

Buffalo Bills
AFC East championship seasons
Buffalo Bills seasons
Buff